Denis (or Denys or Denijs) Calvaert (around 154016 April 1619) was an Antwerp-born Flemish painter, who lived in Italy for most of his life, where he was known as Dionisio Fiammingo or simply Il Fiammingo ("the Fleming"). Calvaert was a profound student of architecture, anatomy, and history. His works are characterized by their advanced composition and colouring.

Calvaert is well known for his drawings and small copper paintings.

Some of his best known works include his rendition of The Resurrection of Christ and Saint John the Baptist in the Wilderness.

Biography

After studying landscape-painting for some time in his native city (the Antwerp "Record of Artists" or "Liggeren" (1556–57), gives his name as Caluwaert), he first studied under Christiaen van Queecborn.

He then went to Bologna, where he apprenticed under Prospero Fontana. His paintings acquired the mannerism of Flemish art and appeared to be the work of an Italian. From Bologna he went to Rome in 1572, where he assisted Lorenzo Sabbatini in his works for the papal palace of the Vatican, and devoted much of his time to copying and studying the works of Raphael Sanzio.

He returned to Bologna and founded a studio. He had a number of prominent young apprentices, including Guido Reni, Giovanni Battista Bertusio, Francesco Albani and Domenichino, who soon followed Annibale Carracci's example and took prominent commissions in Rome. Vicenzio Gotti, Francesco Gessi, and Giacomo Semenza also worked in his studio, before joining the studio of Guido Reni. Vincenzo Spisanelli and Gabriello Ferrantini worked under Calvaert as well.

Calvaert was respected by his fellow citizens in Bologna and by his colleagues, as shown by the presence of Ludovico Carracci, then leader of a competing studio, accompanied by all of his students, at Calvaert's funeral in the Basilica di Santa Maria dei Servi.

Style and legacy
Calvaert typically used chiaroscuro techniques to set stylized foreground figures derived from Correggio against northern European landscapes. His use of colour also reflects the influence of Barocci. While continuing to pursue a mannerist aesthetic throughout his career, Calvaert became a significant contributor the brand of classicism that came to characterize the Bolognese school of painting from the start of the 17th century.

His principal works are to be seen at Bologna, Florence, St. Petersburg, Parma, and Caen. Some of his paintings were lost in WWII and therefore only his etchings of those pieces remain. Calvaert's painting of The Holy Family and Saint John the Baptist was one of the few that was returned to the family through Nazi-Era Provenance Research.

Many of his pieces are on display at the National Art Gallery of Bologna, while "St Michael", one of his most renowned works is displayed at the Basilica of San Petronio.

Other paintings and drawings by Calvaert can be found at the Louvre in Paris (under Dionys Calvaert), The Met Museum in New York (under Denijs Calvaert), The British Museum, The Morgan, Museo Nacional del Prado, and the Museum & Gallery in Greenville, South Carolina.

Works

Notes

References

External links
 
 Denys Calvaert On-Line. ArtCyclopedia.

1540 births
1619 deaths
16th-century Italian painters
Italian male painters
17th-century Italian painters
Italian Renaissance painters
Flemish Renaissance painters
Painters from Bologna
Flemish Mannerist painters
Artists from Antwerp
Italian Mannerist painters